St Ives North Public School is a K-6 government public school located in St Ives, New South Wales. Established in 1961, the school currently caters for over 900 students.

The school offers extra-curricular activities including PSSA (Primary Schools Sports Association) sport, junior and senior choir, chess, debating, robotics, dance, environmental eco-operators, drama and Tournament of Minds. The school stands at number 12 in overall achievement.

The school has recently received $16 million from the NSW State Government to construct new buildings in order to help combat the strain of increasing enrolments.

Sport 

The school has four houses: Arana, Birubi, Kyeema and Wambong, all of which are derived from Aboriginal terms. The school offers a weekly sports program and PSSA sport, which includes a summer and winter season. The summer sports include modball, cricket and touch football. The winter sports include soccer, rugby league and netball.

The school competes in the New South Wales Junior Chess Competition.

Notable alumni

 Sue Fear – First Australian woman to climb Mount Everest
 Georgie Parker – Two-time Gold Logie award-winning Australian television soap actress
 Mitchell Pearce – Professional Rugby League Footballer
 Kieran Foran – Professional Rugby League Footballer 
 Liam Foran – Professional Rugby League Footballer
 Jim Jefferies - comedian

References

[[Category:St Ives, New Reads
Public primary schools in Sydney